Cyril Davies (born 7 September 1948) is a Welsh international footballer who played as a midfielder in the English Football League.

References

External links

1948 births
Living people
Welsh footballers
Footballers from Swansea
Association football midfielders
Wales international footballers
Wales under-23 international footballers
Charlton Athletic F.C. players
Swansea City A.F.C. players
Tonbridge Angels F.C. players
Carlisle United F.C. players
Yeovil Town F.C. players
English Football League players